Bororo may refer to:
 Bororo (Amerindian people), an indigenous people of Brazil and Bolivia
 Bororo language, a language of Brazil and Bolivia
 Bororoan languages, a Macro-Ge language family
 Bororo Fulbe, an indigenous people of West Africa
 Bororo, or Carlos Maturana (born 1953), Chilean painter
 Bororo, or small red brocket, a deer species